Edward J. Montagne (1885–1932) was a British screenwriter who worked in the American film industry during the silent era. He worked with prominent studios of the era such as Vitagraph, Selznick Pictures and Universal Pictures. He was the father or the producer and director Edward Montagne.

Selected filmography

The Wheels of Justice (1915)
 The Conflict (1916)
 Freddy's Narrow Escape (1916)
 The Maelstrom (1917)
 Sunlight's Last Raid (1917)
 The Message of the Mouse (1917)
 Hoarded Assets (1918)
 To the Highest Bidder (1918)
 The Man Who Won (1919)
 Children of Destiny (1920)
 The Daughter Pays (1920)
 Red Foam (1920)
 The Greatest Love (1920)
 The Point of View (1920)
 Chivalrous Charley (1921)
 Conceit (1921)
 A Man's Home (1921)
 The Last Door (1921)
 Remorseless Love (1921)
 Bucking the Tiger (1921)
 After Midnight (1921)
 The Miracle of Manhattan (1921)
 Evidence (1922)
 A Wide Open Town (1922)
 One Week of Love (1922)
 Under Oath (1922)
 Love's Masquerade (1922)
 Reckless Youth (1922)
 Channing of the Northwest (1922)
 The Common Law (1923)
 Rupert of Hentzau (1923)
 The Last of the Duanes (1924)
 Painted People (1924)
 The Storm Daughter (1924)
 Secrets of the Night (1924)
 Alias Mary Flynn (1925)
 The Combat (1926)
 The Mystery Club (1926)
 The Flaming Frontier (1926)
 The Cat and the Canary (1927)
 Surrender (1927)
 Shanghaied (1927)
 It Can Be Done (1929)
 The Love Trap (1929)

References

Bibliography
 Kellow, Brian. The Bennetts: An Acting Family. University Press of Kentucky, 2004.

External links

1885 births
1932 deaths
English emigrants to the United States
American screenwriters
British screenwriters
People from London
20th-century American screenwriters
20th-century British screenwriters